Hilda Clark may refer to:

Hilda Clark (model) (1872–1932), American model and Coca-Cola promoter
Hilda Clark (doctor) (1881–1955), British doctor and humanitarian aid worker